Von brigði is a remix album of Icelandic band Sigur Rós' first album, Von. It was released in 1998 on Smekkleysa Records, and continues to be available only in Iceland or through the band's online store. An LP containing four tracks from the album was also released, although only 100 copies of this green-colored edition were made.

Von brigði'''s title is a play on words. The word "Vonbrigði" means "disappointment", but split in two it translates as "variations on Von", "brigði" meaning "variation". A full translation into English would result in "hope variation".

The last song on the album is a song by Sigur Rós which the band meant to go on Von'', but couldn't be finished in time.

Track listing

References

External links 
 Von brigði at Sigur Rós' official site

Sigur Rós albums
1998 remix albums